A Qari (plural  qāriʾūn,  qurrāʾ or  qaraʾah) is a person who recites the Quran with the proper rules of recitation (tajwid).

Although it is encouraged, a qāriʾ does not necessarily have to memorize the Quran, just to recite it according to the rules of tajwid with melodious sound.

Notable Qāri
The following list is a partial list of some notable reciters of the Qur'an:

Afghanistan 
 Muhammad ibn Tayfour Sajawandi

Bangladesh 
 Muhammad Ibrahim Ujani (1863–1943)
 Abdur Rahman Kashgari (1912–1971)
 Syed Muhammad Ishaq (1915–1977)
 Muhammadullah Hafezzi (1895–1987)
 Abdul Latif Chowdhury Fultali (1913–2008)

Iran
Hamed Shakernejad

Egypt
Reader is referred to as Shaykh al-Maqâriʾ [6] (Arabic: شيخ المقارئ, lit. 'Scholar of the Recitation Schools').
Muhammad Rifat (1882–1950)
Mohamed Salamah (1899–1982)
Mustafa Ismail (1905–1978)
Mahmoud Khalil Al-Hussary (1917–1980),  Shaykh al-Maqâriʾ
Muhammad Siddiq Al-Minshawi (1920–1969), Shaykh al-Maqâriʾ
Kamil Yusuf Al-Bahtimi (1922–1969)
Abdul Basit 'Abd us-Samad (1927–1988)

India
Husain Burhanuddin

Indonesia
Maria Ulfah
Muammar Z.A.
Mu'min Ainul Mubarak

Kuwait
Mishary Rashid Alafasy

Pakistan

Qari Ghulam Rasool
Hassan Ali Kasi
Waheed Zafar Qasmi
Qari Syed Sadaqat Ali
Shakir Qasmi
Zahir Qasmi
Muhammad Farooq

Saudi Arabia
Ahmad bin Ali Al-Ajmi
Abu Abd al-Rahman Ibn Aqil al-Zahiri
Saud Al-Shuraim
Abdul Rahman Al-Sudais
Ali ibn Abdur-Rahman al Hudhaify
Saad al Ghamdi
Maher Al-Mu'aiqly
Mishari bin Rashid Alafasy

References

External links
Qur'an recitation
 Free and open source Qur'an resource

 Qari
 
Islamic terminology